Scott v. Illinois, 440 U.S. 367 (1979), was a case heard by the Supreme Court of the United States. In Scott, the Court decided whether the Sixth and Fourteenth Amendments required Illinois to provide Scott with trial counsel.

Background
After being denied a request for court-appointed counsel, Scott was convicted in a bench trial of shoplifting and fined $50. The statute applicable to his case set the maximum penalty at a $500 fine and one year in jail.

Supreme Courts decision
A plurality held that Illinois had not violated the Constitution. Writing for four of the justices, Rehnquist clarified the Court's holding in Argersinger v. Hamlin (1972) and argued that states could sentence a convicted criminal to imprisonment only if that person had been represented by counsel.  Since Scott was not sentenced to imprisonment, even though the applicable statute allowed for it, the state was not obligated to provide counsel.  Rehnquist called that line of reasoning "the central premise of Argersinger."

Justice Brennan dissented, drawing a distinction between "actual imprisonment" and "authorized imprisonment." He read Argersinger as saying that the right to jury trial existed when (1) a non-petty offense punishable by more than 6 months of jail time and (2) actual imprisonment was likely despite the authorized maximum penalty. 

Brennan viewed authorized imprisonment as a more accurate standard because criminal statutes were written with this standard in mind and the social stigma attached to a crime took it into account. 

Brennan also said the majority's reason for going with the actual imprisonment standard was budgetary. He said that this was an inappropriate standard when dealing with constitutional guarantees.

See also
List of United States Supreme Court cases, volume 440

United States Supreme Court cases
United States Sixth Amendment appointment of counsel case law
1979 in United States case law
United States Supreme Court cases of the Burger Court